Line 1 of the Harbin Metro is a rapid transit line running from west to east Harbin. It was open on the 26 September 2013. This line is 26.05 km long with 23 stations.

History
The Phase 1 & 2 opened on 26 September 2013.

Museum of Heilongjiang Province station opened as an infill station on 23 September 2014.

The Phase 3 (except Wapenyao station) opened on 10 April 2019.

Wapenyao station opened as an infill station on 28 September 2019.

Opening timeline

Stations (north to south)

References

01
Railway lines opened in 2013